is an opera in one act by composer Nicolas Dalayrac with a French libretto by Desfontaines-Lavallée. The opera was premiered by the Comédie-Italienne at the first Salle Favart in Paris on 4 August 1785. It was revived on 30 September 1802 at the Salle Feydeau.

Roles

Discography
L'amant statue with conductor Michael Cook and the Orchestre du Festival de Saint-Céré. Cast includes: Elisabeth Duval (Célimène), Jean-Pierre Chevalier (Dorval), Florence Launay (Rosette), and Francis Dudziak (Frontin). Recorded live on August 8, 1985. Released on the Ariane-Scalen label.

References 
Notes

Sources
 Karl-Josef Kutsch, Riemens, Leo (2003). Großes Sängerlexikon (fourth edition, in German). Munich: K. G. Saur. .
 Wild, Nicole; Charlton, David (2005). Théâtre de l'Opéra-Comique Paris: répertoire 1762–1972. Sprimont, Belgium: Éditions Mardaga. .

External links
 1781 libretto at Google Books
 1785 libretto at Google Books
 1785 score at Gallica
 

1785 operas
Operas
French-language operas
One-act operas
Operas by Nicolas Dalayrac